The Yamaha TZR250 is a motorcycle manufactured and produced by the Japanese motorcycle manufacturer Yamaha between 1986 and 1995.

Yamaha produced the road going two-stroke motorcycle, loosely based on the TZ250 Yamaha racing bike. Parallel-twin, reverse cylinder and finally 90° V-twin variants were produced. It evolved as a natural replacement for the popular RD 250/Yamaha RD350LC series of the 1980s. It has the Yamaha Power Valve System 'YPVS' which raises and lowers the exhaust port depending on the rpm of the engine. The YPVS servo motor starts to open at about 6,000rpm. In standard form it produced 45 hp due to the restrictive standard exhausts and ignition boxes.

Racing
The TZR250 was still raced in the Yamaha Past Masters race series with the British racing club (BMCRC) as of 2021. Racing fuel ratios typically 1:30. Standard exhausts are difficult to improve on in terms of power and torque, but they are very large and impede ground clearance. Jolly Moto (Italian after market exhaust maker) exhausts are popular replacements as they are lighter, produce similar performance while improving ground clearance.

An F3 racing kit was produced for a few years which included ignition boxes, carbs and exhaust, helping increase maximum revs, power and torque.

History
Production started in June 1986. At a cost of around $6,000 new on release it was seen as an expensive bike for a 250cc, but given that places such as Japan, Italy and Australia had 250 licensing laws in place one can imagine the stir that something that could hassle 750s on a track caused. The parallel twin 2MA variant being the UK variant and the 1KT model being the domestic Japanese model that were also fitted with a more restrictive CDI to comply with Japanese laws which stipulated an upper limit of 45 hp for 250cc motorcycles.  Variations between these two models being minimal, e.g. wording on the brake master cylinder in English or Japanese. Lighting arrangements were also different, to comply with UK type approval regulations, particularly the indicators were mounted on stalks rather than faired into the bodywork.

In 1989, the parallel twin reverse cylinder version, 3MA arrived (3MA1). In 1990 the 3MA version received upside-down forks as well as a different shaped expansion chamber for more mid-range power at the expense of a bit of top-end power (3MA3). Then in 1991-1996 the V-twins 3XV.

The 3XV came out in 8 variants with different carbs, ignitions, wet & dry clutches, three versions of power valves, cylinders and each depicted by different colour number boards on the side panels and front fairing. The versions names being 250R; 250RS; 250RSP; 250SP and 250SPR.

The variants closely followed the configuration of motor of the racing TZ250 of the time, sharing the same engine casings, frames and in some models the cylinders, carbs and power valves.

References 

TZR250
Sport bikes
Motorcycles introduced in 1986
Two-stroke motorcycles